South Africa competed at the 2002 Winter Paralympics in Salt Lake City, United States. One competitor from South Africa won no medals and so did not place in the medal table.

See also 
 South Africa at the Paralympics
 South Africa at the 2002 Winter Olympics

References 

2002
2002 in South African sport
Nations at the 2002 Winter Paralympics